"Confessions" is the eleventh episode of the fifth season of the American television drama series Breaking Bad, and the 57th overall episode of the series. Written by Gennifer Hutchison and directed by Michael Slovis, it aired on AMC in the United States and Canada on August 25, 2013.

Plot 
At a diner, Todd recalls to his uncle Jack and Jack's accomplice Kenny how he helped steal methylamine from the train, neglecting to mention the boy he murdered. Agreeing to let Todd cook meth on his own, Jack and Kenny drive back into New Mexico. Meanwhile, Hank Schrader tells Jesse Pinkman that he knows Walter White is Heisenberg. Jesse refuses to cooperate, and is released after Saul Goodman shows up. Later, Walter White Jr. informs his father that Marie Schrader has asked him to help repair her computer and invited him to stay for dinner. Walt manipulates his son into staying home by confessing that his cancer has returned.

Walt and Skyler White meet Hank and Marie at the Garduño's restaurant. The Whites request the Schraders to keep their children out of the situation, with Walt claiming that Hank's investigation will ruin their whole family. Skyler also states that Walt is no longer part of his empire, but Hank, regardless, makes it clear he will not back off. Marie even suggests Walt take his own life, given that he seems content with allowing his cancer to kill him without being arrested. As the Whites leave, Walt gives his in-laws a DVD of his "confession." Playing it at home, Hank and Marie discover they are being blackmailed. Walt's "confession" states that Hank masterminded the Heisenberg empire and forced Walt to cook meth for him. A stunned Hank then learns that Marie paid for his physical therapy using Walt's drug money, which Skyler had claimed were gambling winnings. This lends credence to Walt's story and torpedoes Hank's credibility.

Walt meets Jesse in the desert and tells him that Saul can contact someone who specializes in creating new identities. He advises Jesse to start over and have a better life. Jesse reacts angrily, and asks Walt to stop  manipulating him, knowing Walt has killed Mike Ehrmantraut. In response, Walt simply embraces Jesse, who cries in his arms.

Jesse agrees to leave. Saul admonishes him for bringing marijuana for the journey. While Saul arranges for Jesse's departure from Albuquerque, he has Huell Babineaux take Jesse's marijuana without his knowledge. While Jesse is waiting for the van that will relocate him, he notices the pot is gone. Jesse realizes that Huell's pick-pocketing is similar to how the ricin cigarette, that he previously believed Gus Fring used to poison Brock Cantillo, disappeared. Jesse returns to Saul's office and attacks him, holding him at gunpoint and demanding to know about his involvment in Brock's poisoning. Saul admits to his role but insists he had no idea what Walt's intentions were, believing Walt was "saving" Jesse. As Jesse leaves, Saul notifies Walt, who rushes to the car wash to retrieve a hidden revolver.

An enraged Jesse drives to the White residence in Saul's car, kicks in the front door, and furiously begins to pour gasoline everywhere.

Production 
Millard Drexler, former chairman and CEO of J.Crew Group, had a cameo appearance in this episode as a customer at the Whites' car wash to whom Skyler gives incorrect change. He stated that his scene, in which he says eight or nine words, took nine takes to film.

Reception

Viewership 
The episode was viewed by 4.85 million people on its original broadcast, which was an increase from the 4.77 million of the previous episode.

Reviews 
The episode received strongly positive reviews, with Walter's monologue particularly praised. TVLine named Aaron Paul the "Performer of the Week" for his performance in this episode.

In 2019 The Ringer ranked "Confessions" as the 24th best out of the 62 total Breaking Bad episodes.

Accolades 
Gennifer Hutchison won the Writers Guild of America Award for Television: Episodic Drama for this episode.

Aaron Paul won the Primetime Emmy Award for Outstanding Supporting Actor in a Drama Series in 2014 for his performance in this episode.

Notes

References

External links 
"Confessions" at the official Breaking Bad site

Breaking Bad (season 5) episodes
2013 American television episodes